José Manuel Martínez may refer to:
 José Manuel Martínez (athlete)
 José Manuel Martínez (serial killer)
 Manel Martínez (José Manuel Martínez Bel, born 1992), Spanish footballer 
 Manolo (footballer, born 1960) (José Manuel Martínez Toral), Spanish footballer